The Alaska whitefish (Coregonus nelsonii) is a species of whitefish in the family Salmonidae. 
It is found in parts of northwestern North America, where it occurs only in small and large rivers, and rarely in lakes.

The Alaska whitefish is part of the Coregonus clupeaformis complex (lake whitefishes).

References

 
 

Coregonus
Fauna of Alaska
Freshwater fish of the Arctic
Freshwater fish of the United States
Fish described in 1884